Blood River is a 1991 American Western television film directed by Mel Damski, written by John Carpenter, and starring Ricky Schroder, Wilford Brimley, and Adrienne Barbeau. Carpenter wrote the screenplay in 1971 with the intent that it would be a feature film starring John Wayne. The film premiered on CBS on March 17, 1991.

Cast
 Ricky Schroder as Jimmy "The Kid" Pearls
 Wilford Brimley as U.S. Marshal Winston Patrick Culler 
 Adrienne Barbeau as Georgina
 Mills Watson as Jake
 John Ryan as Henry Logan
 Henry Beckman as Sheriff Webber
 Dwight C. Mcfee as Squints
 Don S. Davis as Congressman Adams
 Jay Brazeau as Hotchner

Production
John Carpenter originally wrote the script in 1971 for John Wayne. Batjac, Wayne's company, read it in the mid 1970s and hired him to do a rewrite. He did but "never quite found out what was going on there. Maybe Wayne didn't want to do any more Westerns. I worked with Michael Wayne and Tom Kane, and they would do things like take out some of the harder action stuff, making it easier on him."

In the script the John Wayne character was an old riverboat rat who was really a U.S. Marshal searching for some criminals. He met up with another man and they went down the river, like Huckleberry Finn.

"I'd love to have had Hawks direct it but Hawks was too old," said Carpenter. "I would love to have directed it, but I don't think they would have let me. "

The film was eventually shot in Calgary, Alberta in June 1990.

References

External links
 
 
 

1991 television films
1991 films
1991 Western (genre) films
1990s American films
1990s English-language films
CBS network films
American Western (genre) television films
Films directed by Mel Damski
Films shot in Calgary
Films with screenplays by John Carpenter